The Autostrada A32 is an Italian motorway which connects the city of Turin to the A43 autoroute in France through the Fréjus Road Tunnel, located in the municipality of Bardonecchia.

A section of the highway was used as part of the route of the 19th stage of the 2018 Giro d'Italia

References

External links 
 Official website (in Italian)

Autostrade in Italy
Transport in Piedmont
Infrastructure completed in 1987